Bisacodyl (INN) is an organic compound that is used as a stimulant laxative drug.  It works directly on the colon to produce a bowel movement. It is typically prescribed for relief of episodic and chronic constipation and for the management of neurogenic bowel dysfunction, as well as part of bowel preparation before medical examinations, such as for a colonoscopy.

Bisacodyl is a derivative of triphenylmethane. It was first used as a laxative in 1953 because of its structural similarity to phenolphthalein.

It is on the World Health Organization's List of Essential Medicines.

Available forms
Bisacodyl is marketed under the trade names Dulcolax/Durolax, Muxol, Fleet, Nourilax, Alophen, Correctol, and Carter's Little Pills (formerly Carter's Little Liver Pills), as well as being available generically. It is usually sold as 5 mg tablets, 10 mg suppositories, or 5 mg pediatric suppositories. It is also available as a  pre-packaged enema containing a 10 mg delivered dose of liquid bisacodyl.

Administration
When bisacodyl is administered orally, it is usually taken at breakfast. Oral administration is known to produce no action for more than eight hours and then to work suddenly and relatively quickly. This is especially true if more than 10 mg is taken at one time. Normally, the dosage is 5 or 10 mg, but up to 30 mg can be taken for complete cleansing of the bowel before a procedure.

When administered rectally in suppository form, it is usually effective in 15 to 60 minutes. For optimal use, if used as a suppository, it is recommended that bisacodyl be given after breakfast to synchronize with the gastrocolic reflex. Two suppositories can be inserted at once if a very strong, purgative, enema-like result is needed. A few hours after the initial evacuation, there can be a secondary action which will continue as long as there is unexpelled bisacodyl present in the rectum.

As a commercially prepared micro-enema, it is usually effective in 5 to 20 minutes.

Mechanism of action
Bisacodyl works by stimulating enteric neurons to cause peristalsis, i.e., colonic contractions. It is also a contact laxative; it increases fluid and salt secretion. The action of bisacodyl on the small intestine is negligible; stimulant laxatives mainly promote evacuation of the colon.

See also 
Diphenyl-2-pyridylmethane
Cyclofenil

References

External links 
|Bisacodyl,00.html Bisacodyl at Drugdigest.org
Bisacodyl Consumer Drug Information
Dulcolax Laxative
Dulcoflex Tablet Uses in Hindi

Acetate esters
Laxatives
2-Pyridyl compounds
Bis(4-hydroxyphenyl)methanes